Harold Martin Jr. is an Atlanta based businessman who is the CEO of the Taco Mac chain of restaurants with locations in Georgia and Tennessee.  Before that he served as 
interim president of Morehouse College.  

Before becoming the Morehouses' interim-president in 2017, Martin served as an associate partner at McKinsey & Co., a management consulting firm. He was a leader in the firm's Higher Education Practice, which studied trends transforming higher education and best practices. Martin is married with two children.

Education 
Martin, Jr. is a 2002 alumnus of Morehouse College who went on to earn an MBA from the Harvard Business School and a JD from Yale Law School.

References 

Living people
Morehouse College faculty
Year of birth missing (living people)
Morehouse College alumni
Yale Law School alumni
Harvard Business School alumni
American chief executives of food industry companies